E. maculata may refer to:

 Ectoedemia maculata, a pigmy moth
 Elachista maculata, a gelechioid moth
 Eloeophila maculata, a crane fly
 Emarginula maculata, a slit limpet
 Empis maculata, a dance fly
 Ephippithyta maculata, a bush cricket
 Ereca maculata, a daddy longlegs
 Eremophila maculata, a shrub native to Australia
 Ethmia maculata, an Asian moth
 Eucalyptus maculata, a tree endemic to Australia
 Eucoila maculata, a tiny wasp
 Euphorbia maculata, a plant native to North America
 Eupoa maculata, a jumping spider
 Eupromerella maculata, a longhorn beetle
 Eurydema maculata, a shield bug
 Eutane maculata, an Australian moth
 Euxesta maculata, a picture-winged fly
 Evarcha maculata, a jumping spider